Sir Robert Lush (25 October 1807– 27 December 1881) was an English judge who served on many Commissions and Committees of Judges.

Born at Shaftesbury, he was educated at Gray's Inn before being called to the Bar in 1840. He earned a reputation as a sound and acute barrister, specially familiar with procedure. He was appointed QC in 1857, and was immediately elected a Bencher of Gray's Inn. He became a Justice of the Queen's Bench and was knighted in 1865; he was sworn a member of the Privy Council in 1879. He was a life-long baptist.

He married in 1839, Elizabeth Ann (died 16 March 1881), the eldest daughter of Rev Christopher Woollacott, of London. They had several children, including Judge Herbert W. Lush-Wilson, KC, and Sir Charles Montague Lush (1853–1930), who married Margaret Abbie Locock, fourth daughter of Charles Brodie Locock; in 1913 he sentenced Emmeline Pankhurst.

Arms

References

External sources
 DNB00: "Lush, Robert"

1807 births
1881 deaths
People from Shaftesbury
Members of Gray's Inn
Justices of the King's Bench
Knights Bachelor
19th-century Baptists
Burials at Kensal Green Cemetery
English barristers
Queen's Bench Division judges
Members of the Privy Council of the United Kingdom
English Baptists